The 2003 SEC men's basketball tournament took place on March 13–16, 2003 in New Orleans at the Louisiana Superdome. Georgia did not participate; it had pulled out of the postseason as NCAA violations by coach Jim Harrick were emerging.

As shown in the bracket below, the designated berth for the Eastern division's sixth-seeded team was instead given to a Western division team, while the designated berth for the Western division's sixth-seeded team was left vacant.

Kentucky won the tournament and received the SEC's automatic bid to the NCAA tournament by beating Mississippi State on March 16, 2003.

Bracket

References

SEC men's basketball tournament
-
2003 in sports in Louisiana
Basketball competitions in New Orleans
College basketball tournaments in Louisiana
2000s in New Orleans